Knuckles the Echidna, originally published as Knuckles: The Dark Legion, was a comic book series published by Archie Comics. The series starred Knuckles the Echidna, a main character from Sega's Sonic the Hedgehog series of video games. The book was a spin-off of Archie Comics' Sonic the Hedgehog and shared continuity with that title. The series served as a successor to Sonic's Friendly Nemesis: Knuckles, a three-issue limited series from 1996. Knuckles was almost exclusively written by Ken Penders, the former lead writer of Sonic.

The series ran from 1997 to 2000 and had 32 issues in total. The first 21 issues were eventually reprinted alongside the Sonic's Friendly Nemesis miniseries in the Knuckles the Echidna Archives graphic novel series, which ran from 2011 to 2013. The series consisted of four volumes, with two more left unreleased after numerous delays.

After the series' cancellation, Knuckles' stories returned to the position of serving as supporting stories in Sonic the Hedgehog, sometimes even tying in with the issues' main stories. Knuckles wouldn't get a leading role in comics again until 2009 with the Sonic Universe anthology comic series.

Background 
Knuckles' first appearance in Archie's Sonic the Hedgehog came in This Island Hedgehog, a loose comic adaptation of Sonic the Hedgehog 3 featured as the main story of issue #13. Following his debut, Archie was receiving large amounts of fan mail demanding for more stories featuring Knuckles, gaining him appearances in several one-shot specials as well as Sonic's supporting stories. Sonic issues #34-#36 featured a particularly significant three-part Knuckles story, A Sense Of History, which was the first story in the comic's continuity to explore the echidna race's history.

Knuckles got his first own comic series in 1996 with Sonic's Friendly Nemesis: Knuckles, a three-issue limited series which followed the events of A Sense Of History. A second limited series followed in 1997 as Knuckles: The Dark Legion, which was also meant to end at three issues. However, due to demand from readers, Archie chose to turn The Dark Legion into a full comic series, changing its title to Knuckles the Echidna by issue #4.

Most of the series' cover art was done in a triptych style, where placing three issues of specific storylines next to each other would form a singular image.

Overview
The series follows Knuckles' adventures on his home of the Floating Island, a floating landmass on the planet Mobius. For the most part, the series focuses on the echidnas, who are an advanced but divided civilization in the Sonic universe. Knuckles himself is a member of the Brotherhood of Guardians, an ancient organization dedicated to preserving echidna culture and protecting the Floating Island. Their main adversaries are the Dark Legion, a rogue faction of echidnas obsessed with intellectualism, weapons and cybernetic implants. Due to both factions deriving from the same echidna bloodline, both hold equal claim to ruling over the Floating Island's echidna populace. All echidnas, however, are united in the struggle against the Floating Island's second major race, dingoes, who strongly resent echidnas. The various conflicts driven by these predicaments serve as the main driving force of most storylines.

Other major plot threads include encounters with other echidna civilizations around Mobius, a conspiracy of poisoned food being sold on the Floating Island, Knuckles' affiliation with the Acorn royal family from the surface of Mobius and sinister forces attempting to steal the power of the Chaos Emeralds, powerful gemstones that keep the Floating Island aloft.

Main characters
With the exception of Knuckles, the Chaotix, and a few others, Knuckles the Echidna featured a completely original cast of characters created specifically for the book, some of whom have gone on to play a large part in the regular Sonic the Hedgehog series and universe.

Heroes
Knuckles the Echidna  Sworn guardian of the Floating Island trained by his father Locke. While often headstong and gullible, Knuckles has a strong sense of justice and is always willing to protect the innocent.
Julie-Su  A former soldier of the villainous Dark Legion, Julie-Su has since defected and become one of Knuckles' closest allies. Often depicted as Knuckles' love interest, Julie-Su has a psychic connection to Knuckles through a phenomenon known as the Soultouch, which has designated her and Knuckles to be soulmates.
Chaotix  A group of warriors formed by Knuckles to help him defend the Floating Island, the Chaotix consists of the laid-back crocodile Vector, the spunky armadillo Mighty, the mischievous bee Charmy and the mysterious chameleon Espio. Later in the series, Julie-Su joins their ranks.
Locke the Echidna  Knuckles' father and a loyal member of the Brotherhood of Guardians, Locke trained his son to guard the Floating Island, but seemingly abandoned him at a young age. Locke makes short, sporadic reappearances throughout the series to guide his son.
Archimedes  A fire ant who mentors Knuckles, Archimedes is kind and good natured, but often enigmatic and secretive, bringing frustration to Knuckles.
The Brotherhood of Guardians  A group of echidnas who have dedicated their lives to protecting the Floating Island, the Brotherhood operates from a hidden base of operations to assist and guide their descendants, namely Knuckles.

Villains
Enerjak/Dimitri  Knuckles' great-great-granduncle and supreme leader of the Dark Legion, he arguably serves as the series' main antagonist. Dimitri stole the power of eleven Chaos Emeralds that were sustaining the Floating Island, turning him into Enerjak, a godlike being seeking to reform echidna society in his own image. Albeit eventually drained of his powers, Dimitri was rebuilt as a cyborg and continued to lead the Dark Legion.
Renfield T. Rodent  A former ally of Doctor Robotnik, Renfield is a shady businessman with underworld connections who operates the Happyland theme park on the Floating Island.
General Helmut von Stryker  The leader of the dingoes, General Stryker is a huge, muscled soldier with a militaristic and aggressive nature.
The Dark Legion  The antithesis to the Brotherhood of Guardians, the Legion is an army of cyborg echidnas who worship technology. Its leaders (known as Grandmasters) are all descendants of Dimitri the Echidna, just as the Guardians were descended from Dimitri's brother, Edmund.

Reception
Knuckles the Echidna has been commented on by media critics for its bizarre nature. Many of the series' elements have been met with bewilderment, including its tonal inconsistency, complicated dialogue and extremely blunt political allusions, all while being aimed at children who might be unable to comprehend said aspects properly.

Legacy
Though the series was cancelled with issue #32, Penders resolved many dangling plot threads in Sonic Super Special issue #14. He also kept writing supporting stories in the regular Sonic the Hedgehog series, which picked Knuckles' story up from where his own series left off.

The plot of the 2008 Sonic game Sonic Chronicles: The Dark Brotherhood shared many similarities with Knuckles the Echidna's storyline, prompting legal action from Ken Penders.

After a crossover between Archie's Sonic the Hedgehog and Mega Man comics in 2013, most of the characters introduced in Knuckles were severed from the Sonic universe through a reboot of the continuity, due in most part to Archie's legal issues with Ken Penders.

See also

References

1997 comics debuts
2000 comics endings
Archie Comics titles
Comics based on Sonic the Hedgehog
Comics based on video games
Fantasy comics